Paul Robeson Theatre may refer to:

 A theatre in the South Shore Cultural Center, Chicago, Illinois
 A theatre in the former Store Front Museum, Queens, New York
 A theatre in Buffalo), New York; see Margaret Ford-Taylor
 A theatre in Hounslow, West London; see African and Caribbean War Memorial
 Paul Robeson Theatre (Brooklyn), once at the St. Casimir's Roman Catholic Church (Brooklyn)